Progress 6 was a Soviet unmanned Progress cargo spacecraft. It which was launched in May 1979 to resupply the Salyut 6 space station.

Spacecraft
Progress 6 was a Progress 7K-TG spacecraft. The sixth of forty three to be launched, it had the serial number 106. The Progress 7K-TG spacecraft was the first generation Progress, derived from the Soyuz 7K-T and intended for uncrewed logistics missions to space stations in support of the Salyut programme. On some missions the spacecraft were also used to adjust the orbit of the space station.

The spacecraft were powered by chemical batteries, and could operate in free flight for up to three days, remaining docked to the station for up to thirty.

Launch
Progress 6 launched on 13 May 1979 from the Baikonur Cosmodrome in the Kazakh SSR. It used a Soyuz-U rocket.

Docking
Progress 6 docked with the aft port of Salyut 6 on 15 May 1979 at 06:19:22 UTC, and was undocked on 8 June 1979 at 07:59:41 UTC.

Decay
It remained in orbit until 9 June 1979, when it was deorbited. The deorbit burn occurred at 18:52:46 and the mission ended at 19:35 UTC.

See also

 1979 in spaceflight
 List of Progress missions
 List of uncrewed spaceflights to Salyut space stations

References

Progress (spacecraft) missions
1979 in the Soviet Union
Spacecraft launched in 1979
Spacecraft which reentered in 1979
Spacecraft launched by Soyuz-U rockets